Escape Academy is a 2022 puzzle video game developed by Coin Crew Games and published by iam8bit and Skybound Games. It was released for Windows, PlayStation 4, PlayStation 5, Xbox One and Xbox Series X/S on July 14, 2022 to a generally positive reception.

Gameplay 
In Escape Academy, players assume the role of students who undergo training to become a skilled "Escape Room Master". Its gameplay is patterned after that of real-world escape room activities, where players are supposed to work together to discover clues, solve puzzles, and accomplish tasks in one or more rooms to achieve a specific goal within a finite amount of time. Played from a first-person perspective, players earn grades by solving escape rooms themed after various academic subjects.

Development and release 
Escape Academy is developed by Coin Crew Games, a video game development studio founded in 2018, with its production led by studio co-founders Mike Salyh and Wyatt Bushnell. With iam8bit and Skybound Games as publishers, it was launched on July 14, 2022 for Windows, PlayStation 4, PlayStation 5, Xbox One and Xbox Series X/S.

Reception 

Escape Academy received "generally favorable" reviews from critics, according to review aggregator Metacritic. Jordan Ramée from GameSpot praised the gameplay design behind each escape room which he found rewarding for co-operative play in multiplayer mode, as it allows all players to easily work together and contribute productively, and that the puzzles had enough variety to "challenge both logical and creative thinking". On the other hand, he felt that solo play is much less fulfilling due to the emphasis on collaborative play between players, and that the narrative detracts from the escape room gameplay experience. Kyle LeClair from Hardcore Gamer gave a positive review, and said he was hopeful that Escape Academy would be successful enough to warrant a sequel. Ozzie Mejia from Shacknews lauded Escape Academy as one of the best cooperative gaming experiences of 2022.

References

External links 

2022 video games
Escape rooms
Indie video games
Puzzle video games
Windows games
Video games developed in the United States